A crucible is a heat-resistant container in which materials can be heated to very high temperatures.

Crucible may also refer to:

Literature, drama, and film
 The Crucible, a 1953 play by Arthur Miller about the Salem witch trials
 The Crucible (1957 film) (French: Les Sorcières de Salem), a film with a screenplay by Jean-Paul Sartre based on Miller's play
 The Crucible (1996 film), a film directed by Nicholas Hytner written by Miller based on his play
 The Crucible (opera), a 1961 opera by Robert Ward based on Miller's play
 The Crucible (1914 film), a silent film starring Marguerite Clark, based on novel by Mark Lee Luther
 The Crucible (novel), a 2009 novel by Gong Ji-Young
 The Crucible (2011 film), a South Korean film
 The Crucible (trilogy), a series of novels by Sara Douglass
 Crucible (Rollins novel), a 2019 novel by James Rollins
 Crucible (Star Wars novel), a 2013 space opera novel by Troy Denning
 Crucible: The Trial of Cyric the Mad, the fifth novel of The Avatar Series
 Crucible, a planet in the novel On the Steel Breeze

Music
 Crucible (album), a 2002 album by Halford
 The Crucible (John Zorn album), 2008
 The Crucible (Motorpsycho album), 2019

Television
 "Crucible" (Arrow), an episode of Arrow
 "The Crucible" (Frasier), an episode of Frasier
 "The Crucible", an episode of the documentary series Canada: A People's History

Video games
 Crucible (video game), a free-to-play multiplayer third-person shooter
 Crucible, an expansion of Eve Online
 "Crucible", a minigame in Fable II
 The Crucible, a fictional alien device in Mass Effect 3
 Crucible, the name of a competitive PvP multiplayer activity in Destiny
 The Crucible, a fictional sword featured in Doom Eternal

Other uses
 Crucible Industries, the US steel manufacture that produces CPM steels
 Crucible, Pennsylvania, United States
 Crucible (software), a peer code review application from Atlassian, Inc.
 Crucible (geodemography), a geodemography system by the grocery company Tesco
 Crucible Theatre, Sheffield, England
 The Crucible (arts education center), a non-profit industrial arts studio in Oakland, California, US
 The Crucible (UNC Student Publication), a student newspaper at the University of Northern Colorado
 The Crucible, the final test in United States Marine Corps Recruit Training
 World Snooker Championship, hosted annually at the Crucible Theatre (see above), commonly referred to as "the Crucible"